The Military Ordinariate of Austria is a Latin Church military ordinariate of the Catholic Church. Immediately exempt to the Holy See, it provides pastoral care to Catholics serving in the Austrian Armed Forces and their families.

History

The Theresian Military Academy had been founded at the castle of Wiener Neustadt in Austria by Empress Maria Theresa in 1751. Twenty-two years later, the empress created the office of military bishop in 1773, to be held by the bishop of Wiener Neustadt. However, the Diocese of Wiener Neustadt was abolished in 1785 and merged with the Archdiocese of Vienna. The last bishop of Wiener Neustadt, Johann Heinrich von Kerens, became the first bishop of Sankt Pölten. After the First World War, there was a gap of over fifty years without any military bishops being appointed.

On 21 February 1959, a military vicariate was established, with Cardinal Franz König, Archbishop of Vienna, appointed as the first military vicar. By the apostolic constitution decree "Spirituali militum curae", it was raised to a military ordinariate on 21 July 1986.

The current military ordinary is the Reverend Monsignor Werner Freistetter, appointed by Pope Francis on Thursday, 16 April 2015. He succeeds the Most Reverend Bishop Christian Werner, who in turn had succeeded to the post on 22 February 1994, and had been appointed Titular Bishop of Wiener Neustadt by Pope John Paul II on 11 October 1997. The military ordinary has the same status as a diocesan bishop and is a member of the Austrian Episcopal Conference. The military ordinary's seat is located at St. George's Cathedral (St. Georgs-Kathedrale) in Wiener Neustadt.

After 1990 the Bishops of the Military Ordinariate bear the title of Bishop of Wiener Neustadt.

List of office holders

References

Katholische Militärseelsorge Österreich (Official website, in German)
 Military Ordinariate of Austria (Catholic-Hierarchy)
 Military Ordinariate of Katholische Militärseelsorge (Austria) (GCatholic.org)

Military Ordinariate
Military Ordinariate
Austria, Military Ordinariate of
Austria